Jim Hall, also known as the Blue Comma, is a retired Baltimore urban planner and body modification artist who has devoted much of his life to transforming his body into an artwork by tattooing his entire body blue and having a variety of body modifications, a process which he started in 1967. As of 2014, he was listed by Guinness World Records as the second most tattooed person in the world.

Hall's body modifications include a variety of piercings and implants, including genital modifications.

References

External links 
 Portrait of Jim Hall at the Baltimore Tattoo Convention 2012 by Valerie Paulsgrove

People known for being heavily tattooed
People known for their body modification
1940s births
20th-century American artists
Body modification
Living people
People from Baltimore